"That's What It's All About" is a song written by Steve McEwan and Craig Wiseman, and recorded by American country music duo Brooks & Dunn. It was released in July 2004 as the first single from their compilation album The Greatest Hits Collection II.  It reached number 2 in the United States.

Content
According to Ronnie Dunn, “It’s [about the] simple things, really. The more you learn, the more you figure out… the more you realize the lessons you learned growing up, the things you feel – that is what really matters. It’s easy to miss that, chasing after a career or whatever – and you do have to work hard in this world, there’s no way around it – but when that gets out of balance with your family, with your friends, with the things that matter… well, that’s what this song is about.”

Music video
The music video was filmed during shots from various Brooks & Dunn concerts, and it was directed by Michael Salomon. It premiered in September 2004.

Chart positions
The song debuted at number 52 on the U.S. Billboard Hot Country Songs for the week ending July 10, 2004.

Year-end charts

References

Allmusic

2004 singles
Brooks & Dunn songs
Songs written by Craig Wiseman
Songs written by Steve McEwan
Arista Nashville singles
Music videos directed by Michael Salomon
Song recordings produced by Mark Wright (record producer)
2004 songs